The 2014 Campeonato Ecuatoriano de Fútbol de la Serie A (officially known as the Copa Pilsener Serie A for sponsorship reasons) was the 56th season of the Serie A, Ecuador's premier football league.

Emelec successfully defended their title for their 12th overall.

Format
The format for the season was played as in 2013 with the exception that the runner-up would not qualify to the Copa Sudamericana.

Teams
Twelve teams competed in the 2014 Serie A season, ten of which remained from the previous season. Deportivo Quevedo and Macará were relegated to the Serie B after accumulating the fewest points in the 2013 season aggregate table. They were replaced by Olmedo and Mushuc Runa, the 2013 Serie B winner and runner-up, respectively. Olmedo was making a return to the Serie A after a one-year absence. Mushuc Runa were making their first appearance in the top-flight.

Stadia and locations
Note: Table lists in alphabetical order.

Personnel and kits

Note: Flags indicate national team as has been defined under FIFA eligibility rules. Players may hold more than one non-FIFA nationality.

Managerial changes

1. Edgardo Bauza's exit was confirmed on November 11, 2013. However, he would vacate the position at the end of the 2013 season. His replacement, Luis Zubeldía, was confirmed on November 26, 2013 and would assume the managerial position upon Bauza's official exit.
2. Interim manager.
3. Interim manager, but later promoted to full-time manager.
4. Héctor González was interim manager in the 21st round.

First stage

Results

Second stage

Results

Aggregate table

Third stage
Emelec and Barcelona qualified to the Finals (Third Stage) by being the First Stage and Second Stage winners, respectively. The winner will be the Serie A champion and earn the Ecuador 1 berth in the 2015 Copa Libertadores and in the 2015 Copa Sudamericana, and the loser will be the Serie A runner-up and earn the Ecuador 2 berth in the 2015 Copa Libertadores. By having the greater number of points in the aggregate table, Emelec will play the second leg at home.

Emelec won 4–1 on aggregate.

Top goalscorers

References

External links
Official website 

Ecuadorian Serie A seasons
Ecuatoriano De Futbol Serie A
Serie A